The Sound of the South is the official marching band of Troy University. The marching band was established in 1939 and has been referred to by its current name since 1965. The band was named by John M. Long soon after he was hired as band director. The band has enjoyed major success in performing at hundreds of marching band competitions, dozens of different college and professional football venues, and follows the football team to almost every away game. The band's "trademark" piece that is played before every performance of the band is called "The Fanfare" and was written by Long in 1965.

Early history
The Troy University Band has been a part of the university since 1939 when Lawrence Peterson was appointed the first director in the newly formed band at what was then Troy State Teacher's College. A year later the marching band made its first public appearance during the 1940 Homecoming festivities. Peterson held his position for seven years and in 1947 Gilbert Stephenson accepted the position as the school's second director. The following year brought many changes for the band including the first show with marching uniforms, the first guest appearance (by Dr. Paul Yoder), and the first spring band festival in 1948. In 1953 the band hired its third director, John P. Graham. Two years following, in 1955, James Patrenos was appointed as fourth director of the then Troy State College band. In 1960 Richard Melvin was selected to replace Patrenos and became the band's fifth director. Dr.Carl Vollrath held the position of Interim Director from 1964–1965.

The band as it is known today ("Sound of the South") was founded in 1965 by John M. Long. In addition to building what has become a nationally recognized band program, he has also served in his tenure as the Dean of the College of Arts and Sciences, Dean of the School of Fine Arts and special assistant to Chancellor Dr. Ralph Adams. He was one of the first bandmasters in the Southern United States to be elected as president of the prestigious American Bandmasters Association. In 1996, he was elected to the National Band Association Hall of Fame of Distinguished Band Conductors. It was during the thirty-two year tenure of Johnny Long, as he was commonly referred to, that the band program at Troy University established a prominent national reputation through its many featured appearances at music conventions, concert tours and recordings with the symphony band, as well as several nationally televised appearances with the "Sound of the South" Marching Band.

Recent history

The "Sound of the South" plays halftime shows at all Troy home football games and many of the away games;  Some recent trips have been to the University of Nebraska, University of Miami, University of Arkansas, Mississippi State University, University of Florida, and the University of Georgia.  The "Sound" has been featured at numerous bowl games, including the Peach Bowl, the Senior Bowl, the Blue–Gray Football Classic, the R+L Carriers New Orleans Bowl, and most recently the Dollar General Bowl. The band has also been featured in halftime performances for the Atlanta Falcons, Miami Dolphins, New Orleans Saints and Tampa Bay Buccaneers. Over the past few years, the band has performed for over 500,000 fans.

Directors of the Sound of the South
John M. Long (1965–1996)
Ralph Ford (interim) (1996–1997)
Robert W. Smith (1997–2001)
Ralph Ford (2001–2010)
Mark J. Walker (2010–present)

Recordings
The band has recorded for the Warner Bros. Records Marching Band Promotional Compact Disc since 1998, which is distributed to over 38,000 bands. This is thanks in part to former director of bands Ralph Ford who has composed and arranged over 130 pieces of music for symphonic band, concert band, jazz band, and marching band .

External links
Sound of the South Website
A Clip of "The Fanfare"
John. M. Long School of Music Website

Troy University
Sun Belt Conference marching bands
Musical groups established in 1939
Musical groups from Alabama
1939 establishments in Alabama